The SNCF Class BB 37000 "Prima" electric locomotives are currently being built by Alstom. These locomotives are the triple-voltage version of the Class BB 27000. Sixty of these locomotives, numbered 37001–37060, have been ordered by Fret SNCF for international freight traffic. 
37007 was destroyed in the Zoufftgen train accident on 11 October 2006.

Names
 37039 - Custines/Böbingen

Alstom Prima electric locomotives
Bo′Bo′ locomotives
37000
1500 V DC locomotives
15 kV AC locomotives
25 kV AC locomotives
Railway locomotives introduced in 2004
Multi-system locomotives
Standard gauge electric locomotives of France
Freight locomotives

ja:フランス国鉄BB27000形電気機関車